Mohamad Arif Abdul Latif (born 22 August 1989) is a Malaysian badminton player. He competed in the international tournament as an independent player. He married an Indonesian badminton player Rusydina Antardayu Riodingin on 14 September 2019.

Career 
Mohamad Arif Abdul Latif won the 2008 Mexico International and the 2011 Kedah Open. In 2013, he won Malaysia International Challenge tournament in men's singles event. In 2015, he won the silver medal at the Southeast Asian Games in men's singles event after defeated by his compatriot Chong Wei Feng 21–8, 21–9.

Achievements

Southeast Asian Games 
Men's singles

Summer Universiade 
Men's doubles

World University Championships 
Men's singles

Men's doubles

Asian Junior Championships 
Boys' singles

Boys' doubles

BWF World Tour (1 title) 
The BWF World Tour, which was announced on 19 March 2017 and implemented in 2018, is a series of elite badminton tournaments sanctioned by the Badminton World Federation (BWF). The BWF World Tours are divided into levels of World Tour Finals, Super 1000, Super 750, Super 500, Super 300 (part of the HSBC World Tour), and the BWF Tour Super 100.

Men's doubles

BWF International Challenge/Series (4 titles, 1 runner-up) 
Men's singles

Men's doubles

Mixed doubles

  BWF International Challenge tournament
  BWF International Series tournament
  BWF Future Series tournament

References

External links 
 

1989 births
Living people
People from Negeri Sembilan
Malaysian male badminton players
Competitors at the 2011 Southeast Asian Games
Competitors at the 2015 Southeast Asian Games
Southeast Asian Games silver medalists for Malaysia
Southeast Asian Games bronze medalists for Malaysia
Southeast Asian Games medalists in badminton
Universiade bronze medalists for Malaysia
Universiade medalists in badminton
Medalists at the 2015 Summer Universiade